Krosna is a town in Lazdijai district municipality in eastern Lithuania, located 18 km away from Lazdijai.

Towns in Lithuania
Towns in Alytus County